Okechukwu Jake Emmanuel Effoduh (born 12 December 1987) is a Nigerian radio personality, human rights activist and lawyer. He anchored the community radio show Flava on BBC Media Action and is hosting the Talk Your Own: Make Naija Better programme, the latter of which has broadcast on over a hundred stations and has reached millions of listeners in Nigeria. He has been involved with several human rights organisations and projects, and is working as a research assistant with the Nigerian Institute of Advanced Legal Studies in Abuja.

Early life and education
Effoduh was born in Lagos on 12 December 1987. In 1992, his family moved to Abuja where he attended primary school. For secondary school, he attended Federal Government College in Minna, Niger. At University of Abuja, he studied Public and International law and was involved as a president of several student organisations including the student magazine, human rights club, Red Cross Society, and International Humanitarian Law Advocates Club. He got a his Diploma in Civil and Private Law in 2006. He received his LL.B in public and international law in 2010, and became a founding partner of the school's "pro bono" office, which participated in several national and international law competitions, including one from Network of University Legal Aid Institution (NULAI). He went on to attend Nigerian Law School and was admitted to the Nigerian Bar Association in February 2012. He obtained his first masters degree from the University of Oxford in 2015 and a second masters from York University in 2017.

Radio
Effoduh was a fan of BBC Media Action (BBC World Service Trust); when he heard that they were auditioning for a male presenter for a new show called Flava, he tried out and was eventually selected from 62 candidates. He originally freelanced as a radio presenter for the programme to help finance his university education, but it had also increased his desires to help the community. From 2006 to 2013, he anchored Flava, a youth lifestyle and sexual reproductive health magazine programme where he addressed issues on HIV/AIDS among others. Effoduh has noted that Flava grew to broadcast on 103 radio stations in Nigeria, and is one of the most popular radio programmes in the West Africa region. It also gave him an opportunity to travel to all 36 states of Nigeria, as well as 214 local government areas. In November 2012, Effoduh was recognised as the Best Community Show Presenter at the 2012 Nigeria Radio Awards.

In January 2013, Effoduh began hosting a new programme, Talk Your Own: Make Naija Better (Talk Your Own Make Nigeria Better) a 30-minute show covering governance issues in Nigeria. It has aired on over a hundred stations, with the aim of a more inclusive and wider listener base. He also noted that BBC Media Action wanted to train radio presenters to produce and host more localised shows.

Legal Career
For his National Youth Service Corps primary assignment Effoduh worked in the law firm of Afe Babalola SAN & co. In 2013, he became a research fellow with the Nigerian Institute of Advanced Legal Studies. 

He is a Partner at Praxis & Gnosis Law and a Vanier Scholar at the Osgoode Hall Law School in Canada. He is currently serving at the Global Future Council for Fronter Risks.

Activism
In August 2011, Effoduh spent three weeks in the quarters of the sex worker community in the Federal Capital Territory (FCT) of Nigeria, where he researched the human rights abuses faced by that population. He presented "Legal Protection of Sex Workers: a need to achieving effective HIV/AIDS intervention in the sex worker population of Nigeria" as a poster exhibition at the XIX International AIDS Conference held in Washington, DC in July 2012. He also presented his information at the TEDxAbuja conference in October.

In June 2012, he was invited by the United States Department of State to be the Nigerian representative and one of 20 journalists from 20 countries for a global reporting tour. He has published a series of articles of his experience there.

Effoduh has been involved with the Sickle Cell Aid Foundation (SCAF), established in 2010 as a non-governmental organisation (NGO) for the aid and support of indigent persons diagnosed with sickle cell anaemia in Nigeria. SCAF has set up sickle cell clubs in many secondary schools; in 2011 they donated drugs to local hospitals in the FCT and campaigned for better educating the public on sickle cell anaemia. In 2012, he introduced the Know Your Genotype campaign, which provides free genotype testing for one million Nigerians. He served as the organisation's vice-president. He was nominated for The Future Awards Africa for his advocacy work in 2013.

In 2017, Effoduh moderated a panel at Oxford University's OAC Breaking the Frame[works] conference at the Blavatnik School of Government, discussing the changing state of the African continent, on the topics of media transformation and technology. He was part of the initialing of monumental heirloom the Philosopher's Legacy.

Personal life
Effoduh's family is Catholic, but he has mentioned that his childhood friends were Muslims from the north, so he enjoyed the food and culture there.
Effoduh currently lives in Abuja, Nigeria.

Notes

References

External links
 
 
 

21st-century Nigerian lawyers
Living people
Residents of Lagos
1987 births
Nigerian activists
BBC newsreaders and journalists